Alfredo Manuel De La Fé (born February 6, 1954) is a Cuban-born and New York-based violinist who lived in Colombia for more than 16 years and is responsible for transforming the violin into an important sound of Salsa and Latin music. The first solo violinist to perform with a Salsa orchestra, De La Fé has toured the world more than thirty times, appearing in concert and participating in more than one hundred albums by such top-ranked Latin artists as Eddie Palmieri, Tito Puente, Celia Cruz, José Alberto "El Canario", Cheo Feliciano, The Fania All-Stars, Santana and Larry Harlow. His second solo album, Alfredo, released in 1979, received a Grammy nomination as "Best Latin album".

A child prodigy, Alfredo's father who was a singer (a tenor of opera) in Havana, Cuba and sang on Cuban radio with Bienvenido León and Celia Cruz in the 1940s recognized his son's skills and encouraged his musical talent.

Early life
He was born in Havana, Cuba, to a family of musicians. De La Fé began studying violin at the Amadeo Roldán Conservatory in Havana in 1962. In 1964, he received a scholarship to attend the Warsaw Conservatory in Poland. In 1965, he performed compositions by Mendelssohn and Tchaikovsky with the Metropolitan Opera Orchestra in Carnegie Hall. A scholarship to Juilliard Arts enabled him to further his studies. De La Fé launched his professional career, at the age of 12, when he switched from classical music to salsa and accepted an invitation to join charanga musician José Fajardo's orchestra in 1966.

Career
In 1972, he joined Eddie Palmieri's orchestra. He remained with the group for five years, moving temporarily to San Francisco where he joined Santana in 1976. Returning to New York, De La Fé joined Típica 73 in 1977. Two years later, he released his debut solo album, Alfredo, and was nominated for three Grammy Awards. His song, "Hot to Trot", appeared in the top 50 in the US.

In 1980, De La Fé signed with Sars All Stars, and produced thirty-two albums for the Latin record label. His second solo album, Charanga '80, was released the same year. In 1981, De La Fé became musical director of Tito Puente's Latin Percussion Jazz Ensemble. In 1981 he resumed his solo career, signing with Taboga, for whom he recorded the album Triunfo. Relocating to Colombia in 1983, De La Fé signed with Philips and released three albums - Made in Colombia, Dancing in the Tropics and Alfredo De La Fé Vallenato - by the end of the 1980s. In 1989, De La Fé switched to the Fuentes label. In 1991 he toured Europe playing in Geneva, Paris and Rome and met Eddie Palmieri. In 1991, he also participated in a Colombian soap opera Azucar. Although he joined the Fania All-Stars in 1995, De La Fé continued to pursue a solo career. He signed with Sony Music in 1997. Two years later, he toured with his own band, appearing at festivals in Denmark, Holland, France, Turkey and Belgium, and reunited with Eddie Palmieri's Orchestra for a European tour.

In 2002, after several years in Europe, he moved back to New York and toured the US with his New York band, led by pianist Israel Tanenbaum. Other musicians included bass player Maximo Rodriguez, percussionists Tony Escapa and Little Johnny Rivero, flute player Andrea Brachfeld.

Discography 
Solo albums
1979 : "Alfredo" 
1980 : "Alfredo De La Fé y la charanga 1980"
1981 : "Para África con amor" 
1982 : "Triunfo" 
1984 : "Made in Colombia"
1985 : "Alfredo De La Fé Vallenato"
1990 : "Salsa" 
1990 : "Los violines de Alfredo De La Fé" 
1992 : "Los violines de Alfredo De La Fé vol. 2: Sentir de Cuba".
1993 : "Con toda la salsa Alfredo De La Fé"
1995 : "La Salsa de Los Dioses"
2000 : "Latitudes"
2006 : "Alfredo De La Fé y Fruko (La Llave de Oro)"

Guest artist on other productions
1973 : "The Sun Of Latin Music" by Eddie Palmieri & Friends Con Lalo Rodriguez
1976 : "De Ti Depende" by Hector Lavoe
1977 : "Selecciones Clásicas" by José Fajardo
1977 : "El Baquine de Angelitos Negros" by Willie Colon
1978 : "Comedia" by Hector Lavoe
1979 : "Típica 73 en Cuba - Intercambio Cultural" by Típica 73
1979 : "I Need You" by Sylvester
1980 : "Charangueando con la Típica 73" by Típica 73
1980 : "Señor Charanga" by José Fajardo
1982 : "On Broadway" by Tito Puento
1997 : "Bravo" by Fania All-Stars
2001 : "Diferente" by Jose Alberto (El Canario)

References

External links
 Official website
 Mentioned in the Latin Jazz Timeline at the Smithsonian Institution, the National Museum of American History.
 Jazz Music Archives Review and Brief Bio
Tipica'73: A Salsa Profile
MTV Biography page

1954 births
Living people
Cuban musicians
Cuban violinists
Male violinists
People from Havana
Naturalized citizens of Colombia
21st-century violinists
21st-century male musicians